Jacques Yoko Kwed (born  in Paris) is a former French-Cameroonian male volleyball player. He was part of the Cameroon men's national volleyball team at the 1990 FIVB Volleyball Men's World Championship in Brazil. On club level he played in France. In the late 1990s he played for the France men's national volleyball team.

International Competitions
1997 – European Championship (4th place)
2000 – World League (7th place)

References

 L'Equipe Profile

1972 births
Living people
French men's volleyball players
Volleyball players from Paris
French sportspeople of Cameroonian descent
Citizens of Cameroon through descent
Cameroonian men's volleyball players